Trà My is a township (thị trấn) and capital of Bắc Trà My District, Quảng Nam Province, Vietnam.

References

Populated places in Quảng Nam province
Communes of Quảng Nam province
District capitals in Vietnam
Townships in Vietnam